Ferretti may refer to:

 Ferretti (surname), an Italian surname
 Ferretti Group, an Italian conglomerate for boat-building
 Ferretti (cycling team), an Italian professional cycling team that existed from 1969 to 1972

See also
 Ferretti Battery, a coastal battery and restaurant in Malta